The second season of Workaholics debuted on Comedy Central on September 20, 2011 and concluded on November 22, 2011 with a total of 10 episodes.

Cast

Main

Starring
Blake Anderson as Blake Henderson
Adam DeVine as Adam DeMamp
Anders Holm as Anders "Ders" Holmvik

Also starring
Jillian Bell as Jillian Belk
Erik Griffin as Montez Walker
Maribeth Monroe as Alice Murphy

Special guest
Jeff Fahey as Doug

Recurring
Kyle Newacheck as Karl Hevachek

Guest
Tyler the Creator as Student Defacing Car (uncredited)(because it was Taco)
Nicky Whelan as Naomi
Ray Wise as Kyle Walsh
Gary Anthony Williams as Craig
Katee Sackhoff as Rachel
Joel McKinnon Miller as Head Cop

Production
Comedy Central renewed Workaholics for a 10-episode second season on May 4, 2011.

Episodes

Notes

References

External links
 
 

2011 American television seasons